W Channel can refer to:

W (British TV channel), UK TV channel
 W Network, Canadian cable channel
 SoHo (Australian TV channel), Australian cable channel (formerly called W Channel)